Mount Rinjani National Park is located on the island of Lombok, Indonesia in the North Lombok Regency.

Flora and fauna
Some of endangered plants protected in this national park, such as: Pterospermum javanicum, Swietenia macrophylla, Ficus superba, Toona sureni, Vanda sp., Usnea sp and Anaphalis sp.

There are also several endangered fauna protected in this national park, including rusa deer, Indian muntjac, Sunda porcupine, surili monkeys, helmeted friarbird, several cockatoos and scaly-crowned honeyeater.

See also 

 List of national parks of Indonesia
 Geography of Indonesia

References

External links 
 Gunung Rinjani National Park
 UNEP-WCMC World Database on Protected Areas: Gunung Rinjani National Park
 Gunung Rinjani National Park for Charity

National parks of Indonesia
Geography of Lombok
Geography of West Nusa Tenggara
Tourist attractions in West Nusa Tenggara